Independence station, also known as Missouri Pacific Depot, is an Amtrak train station in Independence, Missouri, United States. The station was originally built in 1913 by the Missouri Pacific Railroad, and is also known as the "Truman Depot," because it was the final stop in Harry S. Truman's 1948 Whistlestop Campaign where 8,500 admirers welcomed Truman in January 1953 when he returned home after leaving office. Today, the depot is an Amtrak stop and is said to be home to the Jackson County Genealogical Society Research Library. The station was added to the National Register of Historic Places in 1979.

See also

 List of Amtrak stations

References

External links

 Independence, MO – USA Rail Guide (TrainWeb)
 "Fans of Truman Depot fear for its future: History lovers and train buffs want to ensure its future isn't as rocky as its past" Page A-1, Independence Examiner, 10-23-2010 edition.

1913 establishments in Missouri
Amtrak stations in Missouri
Buildings and structures in Independence, Missouri
Independence, Missouri
Harry S. Truman
National Register of Historic Places in Jackson County, Missouri
Railway stations in the United States opened in 1913
Railway stations on the National Register of Historic Places in Missouri